The Punisher: War Zone Vol. 2, is the second volume in the Punisher: War Zone series is a comic book limited series published by Marvel Comics about the vigilante The Punisher. The series was written by Garth Ennis and drawn by Steve Dillon. Dillon also drew all of the covers to the series. The series is a follow-up to Ennis and Dillon's previous limited series work and marked the end of Ennis's eight-year-long run with the character.

Plot
The plot of the series concerns Ma Gnucci who was believed to have been killed when Frank Castle (The Punisher) fed her to a polar bear but it seems instead that she survived and has to spend her life as a paraplegic without arms or legs. She sets out to use her family to get revenge on Castle.

Reception
The series holds an average rating of 7.6 by 20 professional critics on the review aggregation website Comic Book Roundup.

The series marked a return to a humorous portrayal of the character of the Punisher, something which Ennis had not done for some time due to working under the Marvel Max line which focused more on serious stories.

Prints

Issues

Collected editions

See also
 2009 in comics

References

External links
 

2008 comics debuts
Comics by Garth Ennis
Comics set in New York City
Marvel Comics limited series
Punisher titles